The 1976 Football Cup of Ukrainian SSR among KFK  was the annual season of Ukraine's football knockout competition for amateur football teams.

Competition schedule

First qualification round

{{OneLegResult|FC Vikhr Dnipropetrovsk|| (3–0) |FC Komunarets Komunarsk}}

|}

Replay

|}Notes: The match Avanhard – Kolos was awarded 3–0 as a technical result.
 The match Vikhr – Komunarets was awarded 3–0 as a technical result.

Second qualification round

|}

Replay

|}Notes:'''
 The match Start – Radyst was awarded 3–0 as a technical result.

Quarterfinals (1/4)

|}
Replay

|}

Semifinals (1/2)

|}
Replay

|}

Final
November 6

|}

See also
 1976 KFK competitions (Ukraine)

External links
 (1976 - 38 чемпионат СССР Кубок Украинской ССР среди КФК) at footbook.ru

Ukrainian Amateur Cup
Ukrainian Amateur Cup
Amateur Cup